Blue Angel is the debut album by Canadian country music singer-songwriter Patricia Conroy, and was released in 1990 by Warner Music Canada.

Track listing
 "This Time" - 3:33
 "Blue Angel" - 3:35
 "How Many Horses" - 3:14
 "Disappointed by You" - 2:10
 "Over and Done" - 3:58
 "Why I'm Walkin'" - 2:23
 "Piece by Piece" - 2:46
 "Take Me with You" - 3:35
 "Don't Come to Me" - 3:02
 "Walk Away" - 3:45

Patricia Conroy albums
1990 debut albums